Mikaela Howell (born 12 July 1988) is an English professional footballer who last played as a midfielder for Sky Blue FC of the National Women's Soccer League (NWSL).

Club career

Sky Blue FC
Howell signed a short-term contract with Sky Blue FC on October 2, 2020. She made her NWSL debut on 10 October 2020.

References

External links
 
 Monroe College profile
 Equalizer Soccer profile

1988 births
Women's association football midfielders
NJ/NY Gotham FC players
Expatriate women's soccer players in the United States
National Women's Soccer League players
Living people
English women's footballers
FA Women's National League players
Reading F.C. Women players
Chelsea F.C. Women players
Fulham L.F.C. players
Birmingham City W.F.C. players
USL W-League (1995–2015) players
Sportspeople from Basingstoke
Arsenal W.F.C. players